Prée-d'Anjou is a commune in the department of Mayenne, western France. The municipality was established on 1 January 2018 by merger of the former communes of Laigné (the seat) and Ampoigné.

Buildings 

 Église Saint-Jean-Baptiste d'Ampoigné
 Église Saint-Martin-de-Vertou

See also 
Communes of the Mayenne department

References 

Communes of Mayenne
Populated places established in 2018
2018 establishments in France